Earl Douglas Johnson (April 2, 1919 – December 3, 1994) was an American professional baseball player and scout and a decorated World War II veteran. He was a left-handed pitcher for the Boston Red Sox and the Detroit Tigers. Johnson, who was nicknamed the "smiling Swedish southpaw", had a brother Chet who also pitched in the major leagues for the St. Louis Browns. He was born in Redmond, Washington.

Army life
Earl Johnson was also famous for being a World War II veteran, having served with the Army 120th Infantry Regiment, 30th Infantry Division. He enlisted in December 1941 and during that time he was awarded a Silver and Bronze Star and was commissioned a lieutenant.

On the bronze star it read:

Major League Baseball
Johnson's debut was on July 20, 1940. For eight years, Johnson pitched for the Boston Red Sox and the Detroit Tigers. He also pitched two years at Saint Mary's College of California and four years in the minor leagues (three at AAA). For over 44 years, he was associated with the Red Sox as a player and scout, and during his time, he was affiliated in signing some players such as Ted Bowsfield, Mike Garman and Steve Lyons. His final game was on June 3, 1951. 

At the age of 75, he died in Seattle, Washington.

See also

References

External links

1919 births
1994 deaths
Detroit Tigers players
Boston Red Sox players
Boston Red Sox scouts
Ballard High School (Seattle, Washington) alumni
Baseball players from Washington (state)
Major League Baseball pitchers
United States Army officers
United States Army personnel of World War II
Recipients of the Silver Star
Saint Mary's Gaels baseball players
Sportspeople from Redmond, Washington
Military personnel from Washington, D.C.